¿Que Hay Detrás de RBD? is a documentary DVD release by Mexican pop group RBD. The documentary was released in Brazil and Mexico on April 13, 2006, by EMI Music, just a week after the major release of the group's Live in Hollywood concert video. The DVD was recorded during the international leg of the group's 'Tour Generación RBD', and includes a backstage pass to RBD's experience while on the road as well as footage of the band in Colombia, Mexico, Puerto Rico, and Venezuela. The film has also been released in the United States.

The DVD contains live performances of the group's hit songs "Rebelde", "Sálvame" and "Nuestro Amor". The release also includes the making of and the music video for "Aún Hay Algo". Actress Karla Cossío, who was part of the cast of the telenovela Rebelde alongside all the members of RBD, served as presenter and interviewer throughout the documentary.

Cast
Anahí
Dulce María
Christian Chávez
Alfonso Herrera
Christopher von Uckermann
Maite Perroni
Karla Cossío
Pedro Damián

Contents 
The Beginning of RBD
RBD in Medellín, Colombia
"Rebelde"
Making of and music video: "Aún Hay Algo"
RBD in Cali, Colombia
"Sálvame"
RBD in Los Angeles, California
"Solo Quédate En Silencio"
"Nuestro Amor"

Commercial performance 
The DVD was very successful in Brazil, where it sold more than 110,000 copies and gained a 3× Platinum certification. According to the Associação Brasileira dos Produtores de Discos, ¿Qué Hay Detrás de RBD? became the 4th best-selling music DVD in Brazil in 2006, only behind RBD's own first two releases, Tour Generación RBD En Vivo and Live in Hollywood, and the DVD Duetos by Brazilian singer Roberto Carlos.

Personnel
Credits adapted from the DVD's liner notes.

Performance credits
RBD – main artist

Production

Grako Gilbert –  authoring (for Guilsys)
Melissa Mochulske –  coordination
Sofía Diez Bonilla –  coordination
Pedro Damián – executive producer
Luis Luisillo Miguel –  associate producer
Camilo Lara – executive producer (for EMI Music)
Carolina Palomo Ramos –  production coordinator
Raúl González Biestro –  production
Hula Hula –  graphic design (for www.hulahula.com.mx)
Marisol Alcelay – marketing, product manager
Olga Laris – photography
Ricardo Trabulsi – photography

Charts and certifications

Year-end charts

Certifications and sales

Release history

References

RBD video albums
2006 video albums
Live video albums
2006 live albums
RBD live albums
EMI Records live albums
EMI Records video albums
Spanish-language video albums
Albums produced by Pedro Damián